Jean Guichet (born 10 August 1927 in Marseille, France) is a French industrialist and former racing driver. He is best known for winning the 1964 24 Hours of Le Mans with co-driver Nino Vaccarella, driving a Ferrari 275 P for Scuderia Ferrari.

Racing career
Guichet raced sports cars and rallied from 1948 through the late 1970s. He began his racing career as a self-funded independent driver but would later drive for teams including Scuderia Ferrari, the Abarth works team, Ecurie Filipinetti, Maranello Concessionaires, and NART.  

Guichet is also known as the first owner of 1963 Ferrari 250 GTO chassis number 5111GT, one of only 36 produced. He successfully raced this car, including an overall win of the 1963 Tour de France with co-driver José Behra. Following Guichet's sale of the car in 1965 and multiple subsequent ownership changes, this car was sold privately in September 2013 for $52,000,000 USD. This broke the then-current record for world's most expensive car.

Racing record

Complete 24 Hours of Le Mans results

Complete 12 Hours of Sebring results

Complete 24 Hours of Daytona results

References

1927 births
Living people
French racing drivers
24 Hours of Le Mans drivers
24 Hours of Le Mans winning drivers
World Sportscar Championship drivers

12 Hours of Reims drivers